Verkh-Kiga is a rural locality (a village) in Chernushinsky District, Perm Krai, Russia. The population was 31 as of 2010. There is 1 street.

Geography 
Verkh-Kiga is located 15 km southwest of Chernushka (the district's administrative centre) by road. Sludka is the nearest rural locality.

References 

Rural localities in Chernushinsky District